The Curse of the Mummy's Tomb is a 1964 British horror film produced, written and directed by Michael Carreras, starring Terence Morgan, Ronald Howard, Fred Clark and introducing Jeanne Roland.

Plot
"Egypt in the year 1900". The mummy of Ra-Antef, son of Ramesses VIII, is discovered by three Egyptologists: Englishmen John Bray (Ronald Howard) and Sir Giles Dalrymple (Jack Gwillim) as well as French Professor Eugene Dubois (unbilled Bernard Rebel, who died three weeks before the film's UK premiere).  Assisting in the expedition is Professor Dubois' daughter, and Bray's fiancée, Annette (Jeanne Roland), herself an Egyptology expert. All the artifacts are brought back to London by the project's backer, American showman Alexander King (Fred Clark), who plans to recoup his investment by staging luridly sensational public exhibits of the Egyptian treasures. Soon after arrival, however, the mummy revives and starts to kill various members of the expedition, while it becomes evident that sinister Adam Beauchamp (Terence Morgan), a wealthy arts patron whom members of the expedition meet on the ship returning to England, harbours a crucial revelation of the mummy's past and future.

Cast
Terence Morgan as Adam Beauchamp, a secretive key character
Ronald Howard as John Bray, the Egyptologist
Fred Clark as Alexander King, the American promoter
Jeanne Roland as Annette Dubois, daughter of Professor Dubois and John Bray's fiancée
George Pastell as Hashmi Bey, representative of Egypt's colonial government and worshipful supplicant of the Mummy
Jack Gwillim as Sir Giles Dalrymple, another Egyptologist
John Paul as Inspector Mackenzie
Dickie Owen as Ra-Antef the Mummy
Jill Mai Meredith as Jenny, Beauchamp's maid
Michael Ripper as Achmed, Egyptian servant
Harold Goodwin as Fred, one of Alexander King's workmen
Jimmy Gardner as Fred's mate
Vernon Smythe as Jessop, Beauchamp's butler
Marianne Stone as Hashmi Bey's landlady
Ray Austin as Stuntman, assassin on board ship

Production
Hammer Studios originally  offered the project to Universal Pictures in 1963. The film credits Henry Younger as the screenwriter, while the screenplay was written by  Michael Carreras and Alvin Rakoff.

Release
The Curse of the Mummy's Tomb was released on 18 October 1964 by Columbia Pictures/BLC Films in support of The Gorgon. The film was distributed by Columbia Pictures in the United States on 17 February 1965 also in support of The Gorgon.

In North America, the film was released on 14 October 2008 along with three other Hammer horror films on the 2-DVD set Icons of Horror Collection: Hammer Films (ASIN: B001B9ZVVC) by Sony Pictures Home Entertainment, and on a double feature Blu-ray with The Revenge of Frankenstein by Mill Creek Entertainment in September 2016. Its title was misspelled on the Blu-ray spine as "Curese of the Mummy’s Tomb".

Critical reception 
From contemporary reviews, Daily Cinema referred to the film as being "eerie but routine shocker thrills. But, hand it to Hammer, they've got this kind of scary hokum down to a grisly art". Variety commented on the plot of the film stating that "one needs a crystal ball to sort out the reasons for some of the contrived goings on in the modest and rather slapdash horror pic". The Monthly Film Bulletin noted that "the sewer finale has a moderate grandeur" but stated that "it is some indication of the film's lack of inventiveness that the mummy's first appearance should be so lengthily delayed".

In a retrospective review, AllMovie critic Cavett Binyon called the film a "rather dull mummy muddle".

References

Sources

External links

The Curse of the Mummy's Tomb at Moviephone

Hammer Film Productions horror films
1964 horror films
Mummy films
British horror films
Films about curses
Films shot at Associated British Studios
Films directed by Michael Carreras
1964 films
Films set in 1900
Films set in Egypt
1960s British films